Stuart Massey (born 17 November 1964) is an English former footballer who played as a midfielder.

He has worked as a manager, for the clubs Chipstead (player-manager), Sutton United (caretaker), and Whyteleafe.

He began his career at non-league level in the early 1980s before signing for FA Premier League founder members Crystal Palace at the start of the 1992–93 season, but played only in one game that season in which the club was relegated.

He played twice for Crystal Palace during their 1993–94 promotion campaign in Football League Division One before signing for Oxford United. He was more active at the Manor Ground, making more than 100 league appearances and scoring eight goals before being given a free transfer, in May 1998, following a knee injury. He never played professional football again. However, during his time with Oxford he did help them win promotion from Division Two as runners-up in 1996.

References

Since 1888... The Searchable Premiership and Football League Player Database (subscription required)

1964 births
Living people
English footballers
Sportspeople from Crawley
Footballers from West Sussex
Association football midfielders
Premier League players
Sutton United F.C. players
Crystal Palace F.C. players
Oxford United F.C. players
Whyteleafe F.C. players
Carshalton Athletic F.C. players
Walton & Hersham F.C. players
English football managers
Sutton United F.C. managers
Chipstead F.C. players